Sevan may refer to:

Places

Armenia
 Sevan, Armenia, a town located near Lake Sevan in Armenia
 Lake Sevan, the largest lake in Armenia
 Sevan Island and Sevan Peninsula, a former island now a peninsula in Lake Sevan
 Sevan National Park, Armenia

Elsewhere
 Sevan, Iran, a village in East Azerbaijan Province, Iran

People

Surname 
 Benon Sevan (born 1937), Cypriot U.N. official
 Sevda Sevan (1945–2009), Armenian-Bulgarian writer and ambassador

Given name 
 Sevan Kirder (born 1980), Swiss flautist
 Sevan Ross (born 1951), U.S. Buddhist
 Sevan Nişanyan (born 1956), Turkish writer
 Sevan Bıçakçı (born 1965), Turkish jeweller 
 Sevan Malikyan (born 1972), British expressive artist of Armenian ancestry

Other
 Battle of Sevan (924), battle in Armenia
 Sevan Marine, a Norwegian company that constructs, owns and operates floating offshore installations
 Sevan FC, Armenian football team

See also
 Sevan khramulya, a species of fish found in Lake Sevan, Armenia
 Sevan trout  an endemic fish to Lake Sevan, Armenia
 Sevan–Hrazdan Cascade, hydroelectric power station in Armenia
 Sevana (born 1991), Jamaican singer, actress, model